Francis Martin-Leake,  was a British Vice-admiral of the Royal Navy during World War I. He commanded the HMS Achilles during the Action of 16 March 1917 and managed to sink the SMS Leopard. He also commanded the HMS Pathfinder and was a survivor of its sinking on 5 September 1914. Francis was also the older brother of Arthur Martin-Leake.

Early military career
Leake joined the Royal Navy and was promoted to Lieutenant on 1 April 1892. He was then promoted to Commander on 31 December 1903 and Captain on 22 June 1911. On 1 January 1913 Leake was appointed captain of the HMS Amethyst before being transferred to the HMS Pathfinder on 1 October.

World War I
Leake was still commanding the HMS Pathfinder when World War I broke out and continued to serve as its commander until the SM U-21 sunk the ship off the Firth of Forth. Leake stayed in the ship as it was sinking but was picked up and saved as he states:

On 6 October he was sent to Portsmouth to serve in the HMS Victory and to train up Admiralty M-class destroyer's. He then proceeded to command the HMS Achilles on 19 February 1915. He was appointed as an additional commander to the HMS Royalist on 20 June 1917 as a 2nd Class Commodore of the chief of staff of the Commander-in-Chief of the Coast of Ireland. Lewis Bayly described Leake as "a most exceptional man, for everyone loved the little Commodore." Leake also participated at the Action of 16 March 1917 while commanding the HMS Achilles and managed to sink the SMS Leopard and killing Korvettenkapitän Hans von Laffert.

Later years
Leake's appointment in Ireland expired on 1 June 1919 and was sent to command the HMS King George V as Chief Staff Officer to Vice-Admiral Henry Francis Oliver as Leake was promoted to Vice-Admiral at some point after the war. On 25 May 1920 Leake got himself injured in a motorcycle accident but recovered on 5 August. Leake was placed on the retirement list on 19 November 1921 and died in Ware, Hertfordshire on 21 January 1928 after a three-year battle with dementia paralytica.

References

1869 births
1928 deaths
Military personnel from Hertfordshire
Royal Navy vice admirals
Deaths from dementia in England
Royal Navy officers of World War I
Companions of the Order of the Bath
Companions of the Distinguished Service Order